Ioan Inocențiu Micu-Klein, also known by his lay name Ioan Micu (1692 – 22 September 1768), was a Bishop of Făgăraș and Primate of the Romanian Greek Catholic Church from 1730 to his resignation in 1751. He played an instrumental role in the establishment of national rights for Romanians in Transylvania (part of the Habsburg monarchy at the time of his life).

Life
He was born as Ioan Micu (Inocențiu being his clergy name, and Klein the German translation of his surname, sometimes rendered back into Romanian transcription as Clain) in Sadu, nowadays in Sibiu County, in 1692 from a lower-class family. He studied by the Jesuits in Cluj and trained in theology in Trnava.

On 18 November 1728, following the death of previous bishop Ioan Giurgiu Patachi, the electoral synod convened and Micu resulted the more voted, even if he was young and he had not yet terminated his studies. Accordingly, on 12 July 1729 the Habsburg monarch, Emperor Charles VI, designated him as new bishop of Făgăraș. 
On 5 September 1729 he was awarded the title of Baron, and on 23 September of that year, Micu became a priest and immediately he joined the Basilian Order.  Pope Clement XII confirmed him on 11 September 1730, and accordingly he was consecrated a bishop on 5 November 1730 by Gennadius Bizanczy, the Eparch of Mukachevo. From Mukachevo he moved to Vienna, where he pleaded the Emperor for the rights of Transylvanian people. He made his formal enthronement in Făgăraș on 28 September 1732, and, following his insistence, on 11 December 1732 he was given a seat in the Transylvanian Diet.

Immediately after his enthronement, he summoned an ecclesiastic synod which issued 20 decrees on administrative, disciplinary, sacramentary issues. In 1737, he moved the bishopric seat from Făgăraș to Blaj, and laid the foundations to the local cathedral in 1741.

As a member of the Diet (Parliament) of Transylvania, Inocențiu Micu began to press the Habsburg monarchy to fulfill the Agreement that conversion to Greek Catholicism would bring with it Roman Catholic-like privileges for Romanian inhabitants also, and an end to serfdom.

First pressing for rights for clergy and converts, he soon began to petition for freedom for all Romanians. Micu petitioned the Habsburg court for over forty years to this end. His perseverance ultimately made both the Austrian Empress Maria Theresia and Transylvania's Diet declare themselves offended - the Hungarian majority in the Diet opposed the liberation of the work force or the awarding of political rights to Romanians (Vlachs), considered by the Diet as "moth for the cloth". 

Exiled in 1744, Micu moved to Rome and he had to resign a few years later, on 7 May 1751. He died in Rome 17 years later, on 22 September 1768.

Notes

References
Corneliu Albu, Pe urmele lui Ion-Inocențiu Micu-Klein ("Following in the Footprints of Ion-Inocențiu Micu-Klein"), Bucharest, 1983.
Augustin Bunea, Din istoria Românilor. Episcopul Ioan Inocențiu Klein (1728-1751) ("From the History of Romanians. Bishop Ioan Inocențiu Klein (1728-1751)"), Blaj, 1900.
Dumitru Stăniloae, "Lupta și drama lui Inocențiu Micu Clain" ("The Struggle and Tragedy of Inocențiu Micu Clain"), in Biserica Ortodoxă Română, 88, Bucharest, 1968.
Aloisiu Tăutu, "Testamentul și moartea Episcopului Inocențiu Micu-Klein" ("The Last Will and Death of Bishop Inocențiu Micu-Klein"), in Buna Vestire, 9, Rome, 1970.

1692 births
Barons of Austria
Romanians in Hungary
People from Sibiu County
Primates of the Romanian Greek Catholic Church
Romanian nobility
1768 deaths
Order of Saint Basil the Great
18th-century Eastern Catholic bishops
18th-century Romanian people